Charlie Parker-Swift is a British actor.  As a child actor, he was known as John Hudson before becoming John J. Joseph and finally settling on Charlie Parker-Swift. Charlie’s first acting role and best known role was in the children's series Grange Hill playing a school bully called Ian Hudson.

Since leaving Grange Hill Charlie has appeared in EastEnders, Wall of Silence and The Bill.

His most recent role has been in Holby City, Sam & Cat and Mighty Med

Filmography

External links

Grange Hill Fans - Ian Hudson

1984 births
Living people
English male soap opera actors
English child actors
English male child actors
Place of birth missing (living people)